Shan Xin (literal meaning The New Mountain, born 1 January 1989), also known as Wang Youji or Wang Shuang, is a Chinese mainland singer, voice actress and a core member of the TrioPen Studio and Drama Times.

Her name is derived from Kappei Yamaguchi and Kudo Shinichi.

Early life
Shan was born in a family of Chinese medicine practitioners in Zhengzhou.

She once hoped to study medicine. However she liked Japanese anime and became interested in dubbing because of the protagonist of "Detective Conan", and at the third grade began to use the repeater to practice recording.

Career 
In 2012, she was selected as the voice provider of the Vocaloid Luo Tianyi.

Personal life 
She married Huang Zhenji and currently lives in Beijing.

References

External links

Living people
1989 births
21st-century Chinese women singers
People from Zhengzhou
Mandarin-language singers
Han Chinese people
Chinese voice actresses